Thotta is a 2008 Indian Tamil-language gangster film directed by Selva and produced by Mariappa Babu Baskar of Oscar Movies. The film stars actor Jeevan and Priyamani alongside Mallika, Sampath Raj, Hema Choudhary and Charan Raj in supporting roles.

Plot 
Shanmugham (Jeevan) comes to Chennai with his mother in search of his father (Raj Kapoor). When they get to the place, they see him living with another wife. He kills the wife and sends Shanmugham outside. Shanmugham comes out with his dead mother, and an auto driver (Chandrasekhar) helps him cremate the body, gives money to him, and asks him to go back to his own city.

Shanmugham wanted to become a great man but got caught with corrupt police officers and was used for their job. When he grows up, he becomes a big rowdy by the name of Thotta. The highly corrupt police officer DCP Muthuvel (Sampath Raj) also uses him for a lot of encounters, for which he takes credit and gets promoted to commissioner. In one incident where he is asked to put acid on a girl Nalina's (Priyamani) face, he finds that girl to be the auto driver's daughter. He loves Nalina and helps her family.

Nalina's aim is to become a police officer, and she tells this to Shanmugham. As he has commissioner influence, he promises to get her the job. For this, he kills a minister, who is a big rival of Chief Minister Manimaran (Livingston). When Nalina goes to Muthuvel for the job, the latter insists that she have sex with him. When Shanmugham finds out what happened, he and Muthuvel part ways.

Shanmugham's friend Giri (Vishnupriyan), who is also a rowdy, but gets him married to Gauri (Mallika). She wants to separate him from this rowdy group and get settled, for which she tries not to send him for their encounters. After much thought, Shanmugham lets them go separately, but Muthuvel kills Giri. CBI officer Prabhakar (Charan Raj) wants to get Shanmugham alive, whereas Muthuvel wants him killed, otherwise he would be in deep trouble as he was the one who made Shanmugham a rowdy. How Shanmugham overpowers this duo and whether Nalina becomes a police officer forms the climax of the story.

Cast

Production 
The film was launched in 2005 at Prasad Studios. The film was shelved midway due to some reasons Jeevan and Selva went on to do the remake of Naan Avan Illai, during the time Selva's another project "Ma.Mu" with Sathyaraj and Sibiraj being dropped and at the sametime he completed Nenjil and his long-delayed project Manikanda with Arjun. The project was revived in 2007 because of Jeevan and Priyamani achieved success with their films Naan Avanillai and Paruthi Veeran. During the shoot, actor Chandrasekar was really stabbed with a knife unintentionally.

Music 
The film has 5 songs and one instrumental composed by Srikanth Deva.

Reception 
Nandhu Sundaram wrote for Rediff, "Selva's singular failure is in infusing any emotion in the movie. The screenplay is a maze of twists and turns, none of them believable". Sify wrote: "This Thotta just does not fire and is a rehash of so many films, and has nothing new to offer and is predictable". Behindwoods wrote: "Thotta seems to be director Selva's attempt at reviving the 80s mindless action adventure flicks with an overdose of mother sentiment and sacrifice".

References

External links 
 

2000s Tamil-language films
2008 films
Films directed by Selva (director)
Films scored by Srikanth Deva
Indian gangster films